Royal Air Force Forres or more simply RAF Forres is a former Royal Air Force satellite station located near Forres, Moray, Scotland.

The following units were here at some point:
 Satellite airfield of No. 19 Operational Training Unit RAF (21 January 1941 - 22 October 1944)
 Relief Landing Ground of No. 19 (Pilots) Advanced Flying Unit RAF (25 May 1943 - 20 November 1943)

References

Citations

Bibliography

Forres